PSR J0337+1715 is a millisecond pulsar discovered in a Green Bank Telescope drift-scan survey from 2007. It is spinning nearly 366 times per second, 4200 light years away in the constellation Taurus. It is the first pulsar found in a stellar triple system. It is co-orbiting very closely with another star, a 0.2 solar-mass white dwarf, with a period of 1.6 days. There is a second white dwarf further out (within one astronomical unit) which is orbiting both the pulsar and the inner white dwarf, and has an orbit with a period of 327 days and a mass of 0.4 solar masses. The fact that the pulsar is part of a triple system provides an opportunity to test the nature of gravity and the strong equivalence principle, with a sensitivity several orders of magnitude greater than before.

Results were published in 2018 showing that if there is any departure from the equivalence principle it is no more than three parts per million at 95% confidence level, improved to two parts per million in 2020.

In 2022 evidence for a small planet on a wide orbit was found.

References

01
Taurus (constellation)
Astronomical objects discovered in 2014
Triple star systems